The Elm Fork Red River is a river in Oklahoma. It flows into the North Fork of the Red River near Quartz Mountain State Park, about ten miles east of Mangum, Oklahoma.

External links
United States Geological Survey. Source of Elm Fork Red (accessed January 9, 2007).
United States Geological Survey. Mouth of Elm Fork Red River (accessed January 9, 2007).
 Oklahoma Digital Maps: Digital Collections of Oklahoma and Indian Territory

Rivers of Oklahoma
Tributaries of the Red River of the South
Bodies of water of Greer County, Oklahoma